Frank Curran (15 October 1920 – 14 July 1999) was an  Australian rules footballer who played with Hawthorn in the Victorian Football League (VFL).

He played a single game for Hawthorn while serving in the Australian Army in World War II.

Notes

External links 

1919 births
1999 deaths
Australian rules footballers from Victoria (Australia)
Hawthorn Football Club players